Interleukin 27 receptor, alpha is a subunit of the interleukin-27 receptor. IL27RA is its human gene.

Function 

In mice, CD4+ helper T-cells differentiate into type 1 (Th1) cells, which are critical for cell-mediated immunity, predominantly under the influence of IL12. Also, IL4 influences their differentiation into type 2 (Th2) cells, which are critical for most antibody responses. Mice deficient in these cytokines, their receptors, or associated transcription factors have impaired, but are not absent of, Th1 or Th2 immune responses. This gene encodes a protein which is similar to the mouse T-cell cytokine receptor Tccr at the amino acid level, and is predicted to be a glycosylated transmembrane protein.

Interactions 

Interleukin 27 receptor, alpha subunit has been shown to interact with STAT1.

References

Further reading